Scinax haddadorum is a species of frog in the family Hylidae.  It is endemic to Brazil.  Scientists have only seen it in one place, in Mato Grosso.

References

Frogs of South America
Amphibians described in 2016
Amphibians of Brazil
haddadorum